New Bazaar Grama Niladhari Division is a Grama Niladhari Division of the Colombo Divisional Secretariat of Colombo District of Western Province, Sri Lanka.

R. Premadasa Stadium, Sugathadasa Stadium, St. Lucia's Cathedral, Roman Catholic Archdiocese of Colombo, St. Benedict's College, Colombo, St. Lucia's College, Colombo, Maligawatta, Hameed Al Husseinie College, Wolvendaal Church and Grand Mosque of Colombo are located within, nearby or associated with New Bazaar.

New Bazaar is a surrounded by the Grandpass South, Khettarama, Aluthkade East, Masangasweediya, Kotahena East and Bloemendhal Grama Niladhari Divisions.

Demographics

Ethnicity 

The New Bazaar Grama Niladhari Division has a Moor majority (65.6%), a significant Sri Lankan Tamil population (20.4%) and a significant Sinhalese population (12.2%). In comparison, the Colombo Divisional Secretariat (which contains the New Bazaar Grama Niladhari Division) has a Moor plurality (40.1%), a significant Sri Lankan Tamil population (31.1%) and a significant Sinhalese population (25.0%)

Religion 

The New Bazaar Grama Niladhari Division has a Muslim majority (66.2%), a significant Hindu population (16.7%) and a significant Buddhist population (10.7%). In comparison, the Colombo Divisional Secretariat (which contains the New Bazaar Grama Niladhari Division) has a Muslim plurality (41.8%), a significant Hindu population (22.7%), a significant Buddhist population (19.0%) and a significant Roman Catholic population (13.1%)

Gallery

References 

Grama Niladhari Divisions of Colombo Divisional Secretariat